Robert Edward Henrich (born December 24, 1938) is a former Major League Baseball shortstop. He played parts of three seasons, from  until , for the Cincinnati Redlegs. He was used most frequently as a pinch runner.

Amateur career 
Born in Lawrence, Kansas and a distant relative of New York Yankees' Tommy Henrich, Bobby first attracted the attention of pro scouts following his junior year at Compton High School.  He was the center fielder of the Compton Junior Legion team that won a tournament in Anaheim. Henrich was voted "best hustling player" by the scouts.  In four years of Legion ball, he compiled a .482 batting average, as well a .484 average in high school. He ran the 100-yard dash in 9.7 seconds, and also played football and basketball in high school before concentrating on baseball his senior year.  He was an excellent student, and made All-Southern California baseball team as a senior.  Bobby was offered several college scholarships and was also wooed by many professional baseball teams. The Cincinnati Redlegs got a jump on the other clubs, though, by signing Bobby's father Ed, a junior college coach, as a scout.  Soon after, Bobby signed with the Redlegs as a bonus baby for an estimated bonus of $30,000.  Since that was after the 1956 season had ended, Bobby went to Compton Community College over the winter, then went to spring training with the Redlegs.

Professional career 
Henrich had played both shortstop and center field in high school; manager Birdie Tebbetts decided to try him out at shortstop, but said he would definitely make it as an outfielder if he did not succeed there. The former California sprint champion was selected as the Reds' fastest runner in a sportswriters' poll that spring. At only 18 years old, Henrich mainly sat on the bench once the regular season began; he got into 29 games that year, pinch-running in 16 of them, although he would sometimes stay in the game. He filled five positions that year.

During the winter, Henrich went to South America and played in the Panamanian League during three seasons, helping the Carta Vieja Yankees club win the 1954–1955 pennant.

With the repeal of the bonus rule, Henrich was allowed to be optioned to the minors in 1958, spending the season with the Savannah Sand Gnats in the South Atlantic League, while playing third base. The Redlegs recalled him in September and again used him mostly to pinch-run.

In 1959, Henrich returned to Savannah before earning a mid-season promotion to the Redlegs. After a brief stint there, he was sent to the Pacific Coast League, and again was recalled to Cincinnati in September.

On November 21, 1959, Bobby married Virginia Lee Brodbeck (October 21, 1940 – December 11, 2004) in Compton, California. The following year found him playing for Nashville in the Southern Association, and after the season, at the age of 22, Henrich left baseball.

Life after baseball 
After his playing days ended, Henrich went into the insurance business eventually owning an independent insurance agency in Brea, California.  On May 4, 2008, Bob married Terese Jean Baber (born November 5, 1948) in Dana Point, California. His younger brother Jim (Scooter) Henrich was also a gifted baseball talent.

See also
 List of baseball players who went directly to Major League Baseball

References 
 Baseball's Leg Men by Clifford Blau

External links 

Baseball-Almanac – career statistics

1938 births
Living people
Baseball players from Kansas
Cincinnati Redlegs players
Cincinnati Reds players
Major League Baseball shortstops
Nashville Vols players
Savannah Redlegs players
Savannah Reds players
Seattle Rainiers players
Sportspeople from Compton, California
Sportspeople from Lawrence, Kansas
American expatriate baseball players in Panama
Compton High School alumni